The United Football Players Association, or U.F.P.A., is a labor union representing American professional football players outside of the National Football League and Canadian Football League. The UFPA is led by presidents Kenneth Farrow II and Nick Temple and Board Executives Ryan Cave and Don Povia.

Founded in 2020, after the XFL bankruptcy, to become a "collective voice for professional players in potential leagues who are not covered by contracts like those in the National Football League Players Association or the Canadian Football League Players' Association and in order to avoid more negative situations similar to those that followed the bankruptcies of the XFL and Alliance of American Football".

The UFPA is not a legal union, Instead, it is billed as an advisory organization that is meant to advise players and advocate leagues on behalf of players, especially in the realms of pay scales, schedules, safety protocols and legal concerns. In 2022 the union announced its affiliation with the United Steelworkers in order to negotiate a collective bargaining agreement (CBA) with the United States Football League. The CBA between the league and the players was signed on January 9, 2023.

Background
There have been professional football leagues of varying levels since the invention of the sport, but all of them acted as "independent" (or "alternative") leagues after the NFL severed ties with all minor league teams in 1948 and again with the cancellation of NFL Europe in 2006, while players were provided with no formal representation and received few, if any, benefits.

After the Alliance of American Football infamously shut down mid-season in 2019, leaving some players to find their own flights home and the XFL too shut down mid-season, because of the COVID-19 pandemic, players were left without much recourse after the league's bankruptcy filing. Those two events lead to formation of a player advocacy group, led by Kenneth Farrow II, aimed at representing non-NFL and non-CFL player interests in startup leagues like upstart spring leagues, indoor leagues and international leagues.

History
The union was created in October 2020 and led by Kenneth Farrow II as a 501(C)4 nonprofit organization. The organization first action was to warn prospective players from signing with the National Gridiron League, after number of cases in the past have raised questions about whether this is a legitimate league or a scam. They also helped players who wanted to participate in the newly formed European League of Football.

In May, 2022 the organization contacted players from the newly formed USFL in attempt unionize, with a petition to represent the approximately 360 USFL players was later filed at the National Labor Relations Board (NLRB). The UFPA would later join forces with the United Steelworkers as the players union representation on behalf the USFL players. On December 15, 2022, the UFPA, United Steelworkers and the league parent company FOX Sports tentatively agreed on a new three-year collective bargaining agreement starting at the 2023 season. The agreement was approved by the union members on January 9, 2023.

On March 10, 2023 XFL players (among them Farrow, who had signed with the Arlington Renegades that season) have filed a petition (through the United Steelworkers) for a representation election with Region 16 of the National Labor Relations Board.

Presidents
The presidents of the United Football Players Association are:
 Kenneth Farrow II & Nick Temple, 2020–present

See also
National Football League Players Association
Canadian Football League Players' Association

References

Labor relations in the United States
Trade unions established in 2020
Sports trade unions of the United States
Minor league American football